This is a list of lighthouses in British Indian Ocean Territory.

Lighthouses

See also
 Lists of lighthouses and lightvessels

References

External links
 

British Indian Ocean Territory
Lighthouses